Zhirayr Shaghoyan (born 10 April 2001) is an Armenian footballer who plays as a winger for CSKA Sofia, on loan from Ararat-Armenia, and the Armenia national team.

Club career
On 6 September 2022, Shaghoyan signed for Bulgarian First League club CSKA Sofia on loan with an option to buy for the season from Ararat-Armenia.

International
Shaghoyan made his international debut for Armenia on 28 March 2021 in a 2022 FIFA World Cup qualification match against Iceland, which finished as a 2–0 home win.

International goals

Career statistics

Club

International

References

External links
 
 
 Zhirayr Shaghoyan at FFA.am

2001 births
Living people
Footballers from Yerevan
Armenian footballers
Armenia youth international footballers
Armenia under-21 international footballers
Armenia international footballers
Association football wingers
FC Ararat-Armenia players
BKMA Yerevan players
PFC CSKA Sofia players
Armenian Premier League players
Armenian First League players
First Professional Football League (Bulgaria) players
Armenian expatriate footballers
Expatriate footballers in Bulgaria